Akkaya (a Turkish name meaning "white rock") may refer to:

People
 Deniz Akkaya (born 1977), Turkish model and actress
 Gülşah Akkaya (born 1977), Turkish basketball player
 Hakan Akkaya (born 1995), Turkish para fencer
 Sarp Akkaya (born 1980), Turkish actor

Places
 Akkaya, Akçakoca
 Akkaya, Ayaş, a village in Ankara Province, Turkey
 Akkaya, Çamlıdere, a village in Ankara Province, Turkey
 Akkaya, Dodurga
 Akkaya, Kargı
 Akkaya, Kozan, a village in Adana Province, Turkey
 Akkaya, Feke, a village in Adana Province, Turkey

Other
 Akkaya Dam, a dam in Niğde Province, Turkey

Turkish-language surnames